The Capital Allowances Act 2001 is an Act of the Parliament of the United Kingdom that governs how capital allowances are deducted from income taxable under the Income Tax Act 2007 and the Corporation Tax Act 2009.

Types of allowances

Capital allowances fall under several categories:

 initial allowance (IA);
 annual investment allowance (AIA)
 first-year allowance (FYA);
 writing down allowance (WDA);
 balancing allowance.

Under the Act, they are available for specified types of claims:

References

United Kingdom Acts of Parliament 2001